is a railway station in the city of Iwaki, Fukushima, Japan, operated by East Japan Railway Company (JR East).

Lines

Station layout
The station has two opposed side platforms connected to the station building by a footbridge. The station is staffed.

Platforms

History
Yotsukura Station opened on August 29, 1897. The station was absorbed into the JR East network upon the privatization of the Japanese National Railways (JNR) on April 1, 1987.  Services were suspended from March 11 to April 17, 2011, following the 2011 Tōhoku earthquake and tsunami.

Passenger statistics
In fiscal 2018, the station was used by an average of 610 passengers daily (boarding passengers only).

Surrounding area
Kusano Post Office

See also
 List of railway stations in Japan

External links

References

Stations of East Japan Railway Company
Railway stations in Fukushima Prefecture
Jōban Line
Railway stations in Japan opened in 1897
Iwaki, Fukushima